Palladium Books is a publisher of role-playing games (RPGs) perhaps best known for its popular, expansive Rifts series (1990–present). Palladium was founded April 1981 in Detroit, Michigan, by current president and lead game designer Kevin Siembieda, and is now based in Westland, Michigan. The company enjoys the support of a small but dedicated fanbase who praise its various game series for their innovative settings and ease of adaptability to various personal preferences, play styles, and power levels.

History
The first game released by Palladium Books was The Mechanoid Invasion in 1981, followed by the first-editions of The Palladium Role-Playing Game in 1983 and Heroes Unlimited in 1984, with Valley of the Pharaohs released between the two.

Other popular titles include adaptations of Teenage Mutant Ninja Turtles (1985) and Robotech (1986). Palladium was also one of the major distributors of Robotech merchandise for several years. Between the late 1990s and early 2000s, all of Palladium's licenses lapsed and were not pursued for renewal. In September 2007, Palladium finalized negotiations with Harmony Gold USA to produce Robotech: The Shadow Chronicles Role-Playing Game, an RPG based on Robotech: The Shadow Chronicles. This license was discontinued in 2018.

Palladium claims that it was the first publisher in the RPG industry to adopt the practice of perfect binding its books, a move that has since been emulated by many other companies. Palladium also releases most of its titles in paperback, whereas other major RPG publishers mostly publish hardback editions. This format choice has allowed Palladium to provide full sourcebooks at a lower cost than many other game lines.

Although Palladium did not establish the use of universal game mechanics, it was one of the first companies to successfully create role-playing games in multiple genres; for this reason, its house system may be described as "Megaversal" – "not universal, but more than just one world".

Licensing
Palladium has licensed several of their intellectual properties to third-party developers.

The first book ever published by another company under license from Palladium was Rifts: Manhunter from Myrmidon Press, released December 1994. Palladium cancelled the license in May 1996.

In October 2000, Rifts was licensed to the now defunct Precedence Entertainment for a collectible card game. In May 2004, Rifts was licensed to create the Rifts: Promise of Power video game for the failed Nokia N-Gage gaming platform.

In May 2003, Palladium announced that Jerry Bruckheimer Films and Walt Disney Pictures had optioned the rights to make a film based on Rifts. At the time, Bruckheimer was said to be developing the movie in conjunction with screenwriter David Franzoni. An April 19, 2006, press release asserted that "until Jerry Bruckheimer has a script he loves, the movie can't get the green light." In the April 14, 2011, weekly update, Siembieda said that the film option would be renewed for a ninth year.

In 2015, Palladium entered into an agreement with Pinnacle Entertainment Group to publish Rifts material under the Savage Worlds game system. Multiple books, maps, and other supplements for Savage Worlds: Rifts have been released in the years since.

Embezzlement case and financial difficulties
On April 19, 2006, Siembieda issued a statement that revealed Palladium's critical financial difficulties due to alleged embezzlement and theft resulting in losses from $850,000 to $1.3 million, coupled with a series of delays in negotiating license deals for their properties in other media (the Nokia N-Gage game, the Jerry Bruckheimer movie, a massively multiplayer online game license, and other potential deals). They raised money to continue operations by selling a signed and numbered – but not, strictly speaking, "limited edition" – art print by Siembieda, as well as by urging fans to buy directly from their online store if their financial situations would allow for it.

An April 26, 2006, article in the Kingsport Times-News revealed that Steve Sheiring, Palladium's former sales manager, had been sentenced in a plea bargain to a misdemeanor conviction, one year of probation, and ordered to pay $47,080 in restitution to Palladium Books in connection with these thefts. It also provided more information about the thefts, which took place from 2002 to 2004, and were only discovered when Palladium took inventory.

Criticisms 
Palladium is entirely controlled and owned by Siembieda. Some writers who have been published by Palladium have stated that Siembieda's method of management was too centralized and not adapted to the size the company had reached (no delegation of responsibilities, lack of open dialogue with employees, bad interpersonal relationships), which they cited as a reason they were no longer working for the company. One of the writers later apologized for the manner in which he made his statements, but did not retract his claims.

Robotech RPG Tactics 
Palladium and Siembieda continue to receive criticism regarding the handling of Robotech RPG Tactics after a successful Kickstarter campaign raising $1,442,312 from 5,342 backers, ending on May 20, 2013. During the campaign, Palladium specified an intended release date of Robotech RPG Tactics as early as 2013 Holiday Season. Shortly before expected release, Palladium shifted the projection to Spring/Summer of 2014; later the date was shifted again, to late Summer/Autumn 2014, with international backers several months after. Siembieda and Palladium attributed these shifting dates to a number of unforeseen issues including Chinese New Year causing production to start later than expected.

On September 25, 2013, Update #113 echoed the intention of a holiday release and promised Kickstarter backers receipt of product prior to retail distribution. This was followed by an update in November 2013 listing several unforeseen issues holding up production and further delay. On September 8, 2014, several Kickstarter backers indicated receipt of their copies of the game, while the remainder of rewards were awaiting delivery from China via cargo ship. There were six cargo ships containing backer rewards, as indicated in Update #156 to Kickstarter backers. This same update also provided some clarification on delivery schedules and outlined Palladium's 'two wave' product release schedule designed to offset additional delay in providing promised products. Some backers perceived the update implied the second wave of items were nearing production. Citing no specific dates however, Palladium estimated mid to late October 2014 as the general time Kickstarter rewards would be available for delivery to backers.

On July 14, 2014, Palladium issued a plea to backers seeking permission to sell any available copies of Robotech RPG Tactics to attendees of Gen Con 2014, a perceived divergence from an earlier promise to make copies unavailable to the public until backer rewards were fully delivered. Siembieda wrote:

Ultimately, Palladium proceeded with the sale despite disputes over the results of the survey. Several days before Gen Con, Palladium received word the shipping containers containing Robotech RPG Tactics had been tagged for inspection by US Customs, subsequently blocking any opportunity to take the game to Gen Con and further delaying shipment to backers, projected at the time to arrive in early to mid-September 2014 for US residents.

International backers had not received their backer rewards prior to April 2015, nor had report of backer rewards shipping outside of the US been made by Palladium, despite reports of Robotech RPG Tactics boxed-sets appearing in shops outside the United States. International backers began receiving items mid April 2015.

At Gen Con 2014, an attendee received one unopened core box game used for display at Gen Con and recorded an unboxing video of Robotech RPG Tactics to allow backers to see the final production quality. Subsequently, many fans expressed concern over several production oversights and issues. Notably, included game pieces were missing paint, paper materials used to play the game were missing altogether from all units shipped, game pieces contained manufacturing errors such as injection mold seams and pitted surfaces, and assembly instructions were vague or inaccurate with context to materials shown to backers throughout the Kickstarter campaign.

In Update #154 to Kickstarter backers, Palladium issued a brief apology to backers and fans, "Oh, and we only recently realized that the plastic blast template is not painted, and it is too late to do anything about it now. This detail slipped past all of us – Palladium, Ninja Division, the factory, everyone. Sorry. It still looks great, is a quality piece of plastic and is easy to use."

Printed materials missing from initial backer rewards were later released in low resolution watermarked PDF format on the website DriveThru RPG for backers to print copies along with updated assembly instructions to all game pieces requiring assembly, free of charge.

In September 2015, several backers openly discussed filing a complaint with the Attorney General and Better Business Bureau in Michigan, with claims of filing becoming more public in December 2015 during speculative discussions from Siembieda's comments regarding the game.

Palladium made few statements regarding Robotech RPG Tactics through 2015, particularly regarding specific release dates. However, in January 2016, Siembieda released a statement on the Kickstarter project page remaining silent regarding the second portion of backer rewards:

...As I have stated, for strategic and business reasons we have been unable to share with you everything Palladium has been exploring, considering and working on. As you know, one of the things we have been doing is looking into and considering possible ways to reduce part counts and make the game pieces easier to put together. As we get into actual production and manufacturing for Wave Two this year, we will share plenty with you. And we think you'll be pleased. Considering all the delays and frustration of the past, we do not want to even speculate on release dates and other details until we have hard, solid information we are confident with ourselves.

As of February 2016, only 176 backers of over 5000 had claimed receipt of their full backer rewards, and more than 1000 days had passed since the initial Kickstarter project ended. The Better Business Bureau had 14 complaints directed toward Palladium Books between July 2014 and February 2016.

On February 27, 2018, Siembieda announced that they were unable to fulfill the Wave 2 rewards, and that due to the end of the Robotech license, Palladium Books would no longer try to produce and support Robotech RPG Tactics after March 31, 2018, although the game was still announced at Adepticon and Anime North, both events happening after the end of license. Furthermore, Siembieda claimed that the production of Wave 1 items had cost $1.5 million and so Palladium was not able to produce Wave 2 since 2015, at which time, Wave 1 was shipping. As way to liquidate the overstock of Robotech RPG Tactics products before the license ended, Palladium offered a rewards swap process with arbitrary valuation heavily in favor of Palladium Books. They also required that Backers who wished to receive Wave 1 items in lieu of Wave 2 pay the shipping to their location in advance  as well as renouncing any and all legal claims against Palladium Books. The manner the project and mostly its end has been criticized by backers and heavily voiced on multiple platforms. Some questioned the handling of the funds, to which Palladium Books responded with a pie chart missing a certain number of pertinent information (% tax paid, % of funds received as part of the Backerkit in September 2013...)

A certain number of backers requested cash refunds as per the Terms of Services signed by Palladium at the time of the launch and their position in 2014. As of today, Palladium has yet to respond to questions regarding the usage of the funds and the refund due as stated by Siembieda and his staff as well as the Kickstarter Terms of Service.

Loss of the Robotech license 

On February 27, 2018, Palladium Books announced they had lost the Robotech IP as it was not renewed by Harmony Gold, the current IP owner. Palladium had announced that Robotech RPG Tactics Wave Two kickstarter had been canceled.

Siembieda went on to announce on their kickstarter page:

So it is with sadness and tremendous heartbreak that I announce that, despite our best efforts, we are unable to produce the Robotech RPG Tactics Wave Two rewards. Moreover, after proudly carrying the legacy of Robotech in the role-playing games medium for 30 years, our license has expired and is not being renewed.

...As part of our license agreement, Palladium has a short window (from now until the end of March) to liquidate our stock of Robotech RPG Tactics (RRT) products, Robotech Shadow Chronicles Role-Playing Game books, and the PDFs of the original Robotech RPG series currently available

Palladium's Robotech license ended on March 31, 2018.

Conversions 
Palladium is aggressive in preventing wide distribution of fan-made conversions of their games to other systems (such as the D20 System), and also strongly discourages converting the intellectual property of others into their system; while they cannot prevent it, doing so is not allowed in venues owned by Palladium Books. Palladium also routinely threatens legal action against fans who distribute conversions in other venues by issuance of cease and desist orders. When asked why Palladium was so much stricter in regard to conversions than other game companies, Siembieda stated that the policy had been adopted due to advice from Palladium's lawyers, to shield Palladium from liability for conversions of other parties' intellectual property. The sole exception to this policy is the licensing agreement held with Pinnacle Entertainment Group for conversion of the Rifts line to the Savage Worlds system.

Game lines 
The Rifter is a magazine published for all lines.
 After the Bomb, a post-apocalyptic RPG that began as an alternative campaign setting for Teenage Mutant Ninja Turtles & Other Strangeness, but soon developed into its own series. In it, mutant animals struggle for survival, often against human supremacist nations.
 Beyond the Supernatural, a modern horror RPG along the lines of Call of Cthulhu. An incomplete second edition core rulebook was released in January 2005, with more information about the world, which is assumed to be similar to the real world, but with supernatural happenings which no one notices. 
 Rifts Chaos Earth, a prequel to Rifts, set immediately after a war that triggers a magical apocalypse, opening dimensional gates that unleash monsters upon a technologically advanced future Earth.
 Dead Reign, a post-apocalyptic RPG where mankind is waging war on a zombie menace.
 Heroes Unlimited, a superhero RPG.
 Macross II, based on the anime of the same name. The license has lapsed and was not renewed.
 The Mechanoid Invasion, a science fiction RPG set during the battle between human colonists and the Mechanoids, a race of psionic, cybernetic beings who wish to exterminate humanoid life.
 Nightbane (formerly called Nightspawn), is a horror RPG set in the year 2004 (a near-future setting when the game was released). It differs from Beyond the Supernatural in that the supernatural elements are not as hidden and more open. The series is placed after "Dark Day", an event where the earth was plunged into an unnatural, starless night for 24 hours, and supernatural entities infiltrated or subverted various governments and organizations across the globe.
 Ninjas & Superspies is based on both martial-arts and espionage movies with some science fiction elements mixed in.
 Palladium Fantasy Role-Playing Game is a fantasy RPG set in a unique world, which was the home of Siembieda's fantasy games.
 Phase World / Three Galaxies setting, a space opera science fiction offshoot of the RIFTS universe. 
 Revised RECON, originally a Vietnam War-based RPG, it was later updated for modern-era combat involving mercenaries in fictional hotspots mirroring such places as Africa and South America.
 Rifts is set primarily on Earth, three hundred years after a war-triggered magical apocalypse, opening dimensional gateways and heralding the return of magic, Atlantis, and numerous invasions by alien forces. Rifts is Palladium's flagship line.
 Robotech, based on the anime series of the same name. The original Robotech license began in 1986 and lapsed in 2001. In 2007 Palladium reacquired the license and published The Shadow Chronicles in 2008. On May 20, 2013, Palladium Books raised $1,442,312 from a Kickstarter campaign to develop a new miniature wargaming system called Robotech RPG Tactics. The license for all Robotech merchandise ended in March 2018.
 Splicers is a post-apocalyptic RPG where humans have turned to organic technology to fight a robotic threat.
 Systems Failure is a post-apocalyptic game in which the Y2K bug heralded the collapse of the power and telecommunications grids with the arrival of extra dimensional energy "bugs".
 Teenage Mutant Ninja Turtles & Other Strangeness was based on the original comic books. However, due to waning sales (blamed on the childish nature of the original television cartoon), the license was not renewed when it expired in 2000. Many concepts established in TMNT continue in both Heroes Unlimited and After the Bomb.
 Valley of the Pharaohs is an historical RPG set in Ancient Egypt.

Weapons
Weapons is a 1981 fantasy role-playing game supplement published by Turtle Press.

Contents
Weapons is a compendium of virtually every edged or impact melee weapon used in any medieval or primitive culture. Weapons is an indexed sourcebook describing hundreds of different melee weapons, each illustrated.  Weapons are covered in six sections: Swords, Knives, Hafted Weapons, Spears, Pole Arms, and Miscellaneous.

Publication history
Weapons was written by Matthew Balent and published in 1981 by Turtle Press, and was later revised and included in The Compendium of Weapons, Armour & Castles.

Matthew Balent was one of a few future Palladium writers who Siembieda met through the Detroit Gaming Center. At the time, Balent was working on a reference book that could be used in fantasy roleplaying games. Balent was a Library Sciences graduate, and had the skill and knowledge required to pick through hundreds of books to create a general overview of medieval armor and armaments. The Palladium Book of Weapons & Armor (1981) was the first of several books Balent compiled for Palladium.

Reception
Lewis Pulsipher reviewed Weapons in The Space Gamer No. 43. Pulsipher commented that "In my view there is no need to add weapons to those already in most FRPG; but if you must, you'll need to look them up in a good source to get some detail. Ten times as much information about a tenth as many weapons, presented more professionally, would have been much more useful. In short, Weapons is virtually useless."

References

External links
 Palladium Books Online
 RPGnet game index publisher information – List of series and titles with summaries, reviews, and user comments.

Book publishing companies based in Michigan
Companies based in Wayne County, Michigan
Privately held companies based in Michigan
Publishing companies established in 1981
Role-playing game publishing companies